The Referendums (Scotland) Act 2020 is an Act of the Scottish Parliament which was passed by Parliament on 19 December 2019. This Act sets of a framework under Scots Law for the administration and governing of referendums in Scotland on any issue within the legal competence of the Scottish Parliament.

The Bill was introduced by Cabinet Secretary for Constitutional Relations, Michael Russell, on 28 May 2019 as a Government Bill.

The lead scrutinising committee was the Finance and Constitution Committee.

The Scottish Government intended for this Act to form the statutory basis for their proposed referendum on Scottish independence, which the First Minister of Scotland, Nicola Sturgeon, requested the power to hold such a referendum in late 2019.

References

Acts of the Scottish Parliament 2020
Scottish independence